Fort Garry may refer to the following places located in the Canadian province of Manitoba:

 Fort Garry (or Upper Fort Garry), a former Hudson's Bay Company trading post located at present-day downtown Winnipeg
 Lower Fort Garry, its mate, on the Red River near Lockport, Manitoba
 Fort Garry, Winnipeg, a former town, now a district within the city of Winnipeg
 Fort Garry (electoral district), a provincial electoral constituency
 Winnipeg—Fort Garry, a former federal electoral district

See also
 The Fort Garry Horse Canadian armoured regiment
 Fort Garry Hotel, a hotel in downtown Winnipeg
 Fort Garry Brewing Company
 , built in 1920, in Little Brook, Nova Scotia